Julio Cruz may refer to:

 Julio Cruz (baseball) (1954–2022), American baseball player
 Julio Cruz (Mexican footballer) (born 1995), Mexican football striker
 Julio Cruz (Argentine footballer) (born 1974), Argentinian football forward
 Julio Santa Cruz (born 1990), Paraguayan footballer